Angela Ruth Annabell (née Greenwood, 15 May 1929 – 1 June 2000) was a New Zealand musicologist. She researched and wrote largely about folk music.

Biography 
Annabell completed a master's degree in music at the University of Auckland in 1968. Her 1975 doctoral thesis, titled New Zealand Cultural and Economic Development Reflected in Song, is considered the most thorough discussion of New Zealand folk music and song.

She later became a lecturer at the University of Auckland, and was also closely involved with the Auckland branch of the New Zealand Folklore Society. Some of her research centred on the New Zealand song Now Is the Hour.

Annabell died on 1 June 2000, and her ashes were buried at Purewa Cemetery, Auckland.

References

1929 births
2000 deaths
University of Auckland alumni
Academic staff of the University of Auckland
20th-century musicologists
Burials at Purewa Cemetery